You Have the Right to Remain Silent is the second studio album by American country music group Perfect Stranger. It was released on June 13, 1995 via Curb Records. The album includes the singles "Ridin' the Rodeo", "You Have the Right to Remain Silent", "I'm a Stranger Here Myself" and "Remember the Ride".

"You Have the Right to Remain Silent" was previously cut by Les Taylor, former ex-member of Exile, for his 1991 Epic album "Blue Kentucky Wind" and was originally titled "For the Rest of Your Life".

Track listing

Chart performance

References

1995 albums
Perfect Stranger (band) albums
Curb Records albums